The Inasmuch Foundation is a grant-making foundation based in Oklahoma, United States. It provides financial contributions to projects focusing on education, health and human services, arts, historic preservation and environmental concerns in the state of Oklahoma and the Colorado Springs area. It was established in 1982 by Edith Kinney Gaylord. The foundation is dedicated to upholding the values and interests of its founder.

Robert J. Ross has served as the CEO and president of the Inasmuch Foundation and the Ethics and Excellence in Journalism Foundation since 2003.

In 2011, the foundation's assets were $271 million. It distributed $10.7 million in grants that year.

Mission

Inasmuch Foundation champions journalism, education, human services, and community to improve the quality of life for Oklahomans.

Name
The foundation takes its name from the Gospel of Saint Matthew, "Inasmuch as ye have done it unto one of the least of these, my brethren, ye have done it unto me."

Grant recipients
Inasmuch Foundation has supported over 250 non-profit organizations. Grant recipients have included:
 United Way of Central Oklahoma
 Sunbeam Family Services
 Regional Food Bank of Oklahoma
 Family & Children's Services of Tulsa
 Pikes Peak Community Action Agency
 Oklahoma Shakespeare in the Park
 Lyric Theater
 Community Literacy Centers
 KIPP Reach Academy Charter School

Notable contributions
Some of Inasmuch Foundation's notable sponsorships have been awarded to:
 Oklahoma City Educare
 University of Oklahoma, Gaylord College of Journalism and Mass Communication
 Oklahoma City Museum of Art, Roman Art from the Louvre Exhibit
 Western Heights Public School, Common Language for Accountability Project

Founder
Edith Kinney Gaylord was born March 5, 1916, in Oklahoma City to parents Inez and E. K. Gaylord. Her father was editor and publisher of The Oklahoman and The Oklahoma City Times. Edith attended Colorado College in Colorado Springs before graduating from Wells College in Aurora, New York, in spring 1939 with a Bachelor of Arts degree.

Gaylord began her journalistic career reporting for her father's newspaper and radio station in Oklahoma City. In summer 1942, she was hired by the Associated Press in New York and was transferred five months later to their Washington, D.C. bureau. She was the first female employee on the general news staff.

She filed stories from New York, Hollywood, San Francisco and Chicago while following Madam Chiang Kai-shek on her tour of America. When first lady Eleanor Roosevelt insisted the AP send a female reporter to cover her news conferences, Gaylord was assigned to the task.

In 1944, Gaylord was elected president of the National Women's Press Club, and served as secretary of Mrs. Roosevelt's press conference committee and media liaison between her and the press. She also covered other notable events, including the death of Franklin Roosevelt, the new first lady Bess Truman and the 1953 coronation of Queen Elizabeth II in London.

Gaylord returned to Oklahoma City and rejoined the family business in 1963, serving as a member of the board of directors and corporate secretary for The Oklahoma Publishing Company.

Gaylord began her philanthropy efforts in the 1960s, often donating anonymously to those in need. In 1982 she founded both Inasmuch Foundation and Ethics and Excellence in Journalism Foundation to carry out her giving. Gaylord became a charter trustee at Colorado College in Colorado Springs and was awarded an honorary Doctor of Humane Letters degree from the college in 1992. The University of Oklahoma also presented Gaylord with an honorary Doctor of Humane Letters degree in 1997 for her contributions.

Edith Kinney Gaylord died on January 28, 2001, at St. Anthony's Heart Hospital in Oklahoma City, the same hospital where she had been born 84 years earlier.

References

External links
 

Non-profit organizations based in Oklahoma
Educational foundations in the United States